The Lepidoptera of Saint Helena, Ascension Island and Tristan da Cunha consist of the butterflies and moths recorded from those places. According to a recent estimate, there are a total of about 120 Lepidoptera species present.

Butterflies

Lycaenidae
 Lampides boeticus (Linnaeus, 1767)

Nymphalidae
 Danaus chrysippus (Linnaeus, 1758)
 Danaus plexippus (Linnaeus, 1758)
 Hypolimnas misippus (Linnaeus, 1764)
 Vanessa braziliensis (Moore, 1883)
 Vanessa cardui (Linnaeus, 1758)

Moths

Choreutidae
 Tebenna micalis (Mann, 1857)

Cosmopterigidae
 Cosmopterix attenuatella (Walker, 1864)

Crambidae
 Cnaphalocrocis trapezalis (Guenée, 1854)
 Diaphana indica (Saunders, 1851)
 Helenoscoparia helenensis (E. Wollaston, 1879)
 Helenoscoparia lucidalis (Walker, 1875)
 Helenoscoparia nigritalis (Walker, 1875)
 Helenoscoparia scintillulalis (E. Wollaston, 1879)
 Helenoscoparia transversalis (E. Wollaston, 1879)
 Hellula undalis (Fabricius, 1781)
 Herpetogramma licarsisalis (Walker, 1859)
 Herpetogramma phaeopteralis (Guenée, 1854)
 Hodebertia testalis (Fabricius, 1794)
 Spoladea recurvalis (Fabricius, 1775)
 Udea delineatalis (Walker, 1875)
 Udea ferrugalis (Hübner, 1796)
 Udea hageni Viette, 1952
 Uresiphita polygonalis ([Denis & Schiffermüller], 1775)
 Zovax whiteheadii (E. Wollaston, 1879)

Elachistidae
 Elachista trifasciata (E. Wollaston, 1879)

Gelechiidae
 Phthorimaea operculella (Zeller, 1873)

Geometridae
 Chiasmia separata (Druce, 1883)
 Orthonama obstipata (Fabricius, 1794)
 Rhodometra sacraria (Linnaeus, 1767)
 Scopula separata (Walker, 1875)

Glyphipterigidae
 Glyphipterix semilunaris E. Wollaston, 1879

Gracillariidae
 Phyllonorycter aurifascia (Walker, 1875)

Hepialidae
 Eudalaca sanctahelena Viette, 1951

Lyonetiidae
 Leucoptera auronivea (Walker, 1875)

Noctuidae
 Acanthodelta janata (Linnaeus, 1758)
 Achaea catella Guenée, 1852
 Agrotis costalis Walker, 1857
 Agrotis ipsilon (Hufnagel, 1766)
 Agrotis pallidula Walker, 1875
 Agrotis segetum ([Denis & Schiffermüller], 1775)
 Anomis flava (Fabricius, 1775)
 Ascalapha odorata (Linnaeus, 1758)
 Caradrina atriluna Guenée, 1852
 Chrysodeixis acuta (Walker, 1858)
 Chrysodeixis dalei E. Wollaston, 1879
 Condica capensis (Guenée, 1852)
 Condica circuita (Guenée, 1852)
 Craterestra subvelata (Walker, 1875)
 Ctenoplusia limbirena (Guenée, 1852)
 Dimorphinoctua cunhaensis Viette, 1952
 Dimorphinoctua goughensis D. S. Fletcher, 1963
 Dimorphinoctua pilifera (Walker, 1857)
 Eudocima apta (Walker, [1858])
 Faronta exoul (Walker, 1856)
 Helicoverpa armigera (Hübner, 1827)
 Helicoverpa helenae Hardwick, 1965
 Hypena helenae Berio, 1972
 Hypena masurialis (Hübner, 1825)
 Hypena obacerralis Walker, [1859]
 Hypocala rostrata (Fabricius, 1794)
 Leucania ptyonophora (Hampson, 1905)
 Lycophotia porphyrea (Denis & Schiffermüller, 1775)
 Melipotis obliquivia (Hampson, 1926)
 Mocis punctularis (Hübner, 1808)
 Mythimna loreyi (Duponchel, 1827)
 Ophiusa tirhaca (Cramer, 1777)
 Pandesma robusta (Walker, 1858)
 Peridroma goughi D. S. Fletcher, 1963
 Peridroma saucia (Hübner, [1808])
 Simplicia extinctalis (Zeller, 1852)
 Spodoptera exigua (Hübner, 1808)
 Spodoptera littoralis (Boisduval, 1833)
 Trichoplusia ni (Hübner, [1803])
 Trichoplusia orichalcea (Fabricius, 1775)
 Vittaplusia vittata (Wallengren, 1856)

Oecophoridae
 Agonopterix goughi (Bradley, 1958)
 Endrosis sarcitrella (Linnaeus, 1758)
 Hofmannophila pseudospretella (Stainton, 1849)
 Schiffermuelleria pictipennis (E. Wollaston, 1879)
 Schiffermuelleria splendidula (E. Wollaston, 1879)

Plutellidae
 Plutella xylostella (Linnaeus, 1758)

Pterophoridae
 Agdistis sanctaehelenae (E. Wollaston, 1879)
 Hellinsia subnotatus (Walker, 1875)
 Megalorhipida defectalis (Walker, 1864)
 Stenodacma wahlbergi (Zeller, 1852)

Pyralidae
 Anagasta kuehniella (Zeller, 1879)
 Cactoblastis cactorum (Berg, 1885)
 Ephestia kuehniella Zeller, 1879
 Homoeosoma privata (Walker, 1875)
 Hypargyria metalliferella Ragonot, 1888
 Ocrasa nostralis (Guenée, 1854)
 Pyralis farinalis Linnaeus, 1758
 Pyralis manihotalis Guenee, 1854
 Thylacoptila paurosema Meyrick, 1885

Sphingidae
 Acherontia atropos (Linnaeus, 1758)
 Agrius convolvuli (Linnaeus, 1758)
 Agrius cingulata (Fabricius, 1775)
 Hippotion celerio (Linnaeus, 1758)

Tineidae
 Erechthias ascensionae Davis & Mendel, 2013
 Erechthias grayi Davis & Mendel, 2013
 Erechthias minuscula (Walsingham, 1897)
 Monopis crocicapitella (Clemens, 1859)
 Niditinea fuscella (Linnaeus, 1758)
 Opogona actaeon (E. Wollaston, 1879)
 Opogona anticella (Walker, 1875)
 Opogona apicalis (E. Wollaston, 1879)
 Opogona atlantica (E. Wollaston, 1879)
 Opogona binotatella (Walker, 1875)
 Opogona brunneomarmorata (E. Wollaston, 1879)
 Opogona compositarum (E. Wollaston, 1879)
 Opogona congenera (E. Wollaston, 1879)
 Opogona divisa (E. Wollaston, 1879)
 Opogona fasciculata (E. Wollaston, 1879)
 Opogona flavotincta (E. Wollaston, 1879)
 Opogona helenae (E. Wollaston, 1879)
 Opogona helenaeoides (E. Wollaston, 1879)
 Opogona irrorata (E. Wollaston, 1879)
 Opogona niveopicta (E. Wollaston, 1879)
 Opogona omoscopa (Meyrick, 1893)
 Opogona recurva (E. Wollaston, 1879)
 Opogona sacchari (Bojer, 1856)
 Opogona scalaris (E. Wollaston, 1879)
 Opogona subaeneella (Walker, 1875)
 Opogona ursella (Walker, 1875)
 Opogona vilis (E. Wollaston, 1879)
 Phereoeca allutella (Rebel, 1892)
 Tinea aureomarmorata E. Wollaston, 1879
 Tinea bicolor E. Wollaston, 1879
 Tinea dubiella Stainton, 1857
 Tinea fasciolata E. Wollaston, 1879
 Tinea flavofimbriata E. Wollaston, 1879
 Tinea minutissima E. Wollaston, 1879
 Tinea pellionella Linnaeus, 1758
 Tinea piperata E. Wollaston, 1879
 Tinea pulveripennis E. Wollaston, 1879
 Tinea pulverulenta E. Wollaston, 1879
 Tinea subalbidella Stainton, 1867

Tortricidae
 Crocidosema plebejana Zeller, 1847
 Lozotaenia capensana (Walker, 1863)
 Thaumatotibia leucotreta (Meyrick, 1913)

Uraniidae
 Chrysiridia prometheus (Drapiez, 1819)

References

Sources
  
 

 

'
'
Saint Helena
Saint Helena
Saint Helena
Saint Helena